Guraleus alucinans is a species of sea snail, a marine gastropod mollusk in the family Mangeliidae.

Description
The length of the shell attains 12 mm, its diameter 3 mm.

(Original description) This is one of the most widespread and variable of Australian marine temperate gastropods. . The short fusiform shell contains 7–8 obtusely angulated whorls. This species may be distinguished by its thick, rounded, straight ribs. The spiral grooves are more or less distinct. Some specimens are nearly white ; in others numerous sienna brown spiral lines, which extends from the angle down to the suture, cross the ribs, interrupted by the interstices, as in Guraleus pictus. There is generally a brown line just above the angle.

Distribution
This marine species is endemic to Australia and can be found off South Australia and New South Wales.

References

 Crosse, H. & Fischer, P. 1865. Description d'espèces nouvelles d'Australie provenant dela collection de M. Geo French Angas. Journal de Conchyliologie 13: 422–429, pl. 11, figs 1–7
 Angas, G.F. 1865. On the marine molluscan fauna of the Province of South Australia, with a list of all the species known up to the present time, together with remarks on their habitats and distribution, etc. Proceedings of the Zoological Society of London 1865: 155-"180" (=190)
 Tate, R. & May, W.L. 1901. A revised census of the marine Mollusca of Tasmania. Proceedings of the Linnean Society of New South Wales 26(3): 344–471

External links
  Tucker, J.K. 2004 Catalog of recent and fossil turrids (Mollusca: Gastropoda). Zootaxa 682:1–1295.
 

alucinans
Gastropods described in 1896
Gastropods of Australia